Lectionary 84, designated by siglum ℓ 84 (in the Gregory-Aland numbering), is a Greek manuscript of the New Testament, on parchment leaves. Palaeographically it has been assigned to the 13th-century.

Description 

The codex contains lessons from the New Testament and Old Testament lectionary. It is written in Greek minuscule letters, on 212 parchment leaves. The writing stands in 2 columns per page, 66 lines per page. 
It contains Menaion with lessons to 5 September – 15 February.

History 

Scholz examined it partially. It was examined and described by Paulin Martin. C. R. Gregory saw it in 1885.

The manuscript is not cited in the critical editions of the Greek New Testament (UBS3).

Currently the codex is located in the Bibliothèque nationale de France (Suppl. Gr. 32) in Paris.

See also 

 List of New Testament lectionaries
 Biblical manuscript
 Textual criticism

References 

Greek New Testament lectionaries
13th-century biblical manuscripts
Bibliothèque nationale de France collections